Valea Porcului River may refer to:
 Valea Porcului, tributary of the Geoagiu in Hunedoara County, Romania
 Valea Porcului, tributary of the Ilba in Maramureș County, Romania
 Valea Porcului, tributary of the Iza in Maramureș County, Romania